Kevin Federik Ramírez Dutra (born 1 April 1994) is a Uruguayan professional footballer who plays as a winger for Liga MX club Puebla.

Career
Ramírez started his career with Montevideo Wanderers. He made his professional debut on 8 February 2014 during a Uruguayan Primera División fixture with Liverpool, which was one of ten appearances during 2013–14. In 2014–15, Ramírez featured another ten times but also scored his first senior goal; netting the club's second goal of a 2–3 loss to Racing Club. Midway through 2014–15, Ramírez was loaned to Miramar Misiones of the Uruguayan Segunda División. He scored six goals for them, including a double netted over Progreso on 31 March 2015, in nine appearances as Miramar Misiones finished mid-table.

On 9 January 2016, Ramírez joined Uruguayan Primera División side Nacional; having spent the previous six months back with Montevideo Wanderers. In his first three seasons with Nacional, Ramírez scored nine goals in sixty-four encounters in all competitions; during which time they won the 2016 Uruguayan Primera División. January 2018 saw Ramírez join Categoría Primera A's América de Cali on loan. Six months later, Tigre of the Argentine Primera División loaned Ramírez. His first appearance came in a Copa Argentina tie with Guillermo Brown in July. Despite joining for a year, he ended his loan in December.

On 11 August 2019 Mexican club Atlante FC announced, that they had signed Ramírez.

Career statistics

Honours
Nacional
 Uruguayan Primera División: 2016

References

External links

1994 births
Living people
People from Rivera Department
Uruguayan footballers
Association football forwards
Uruguayan expatriate footballers
Uruguayan Primera División players
Uruguayan Segunda División players
Categoría Primera A players
Argentine Primera División players
Liga MX players
Ascenso MX players
Montevideo Wanderers F.C. players
Miramar Misiones players
Club Nacional de Football players
América de Cali footballers
Club Atlético Tigre footballers
Atlante F.C. footballers
Querétaro F.C. footballers
Expatriate footballers in Colombia
Expatriate footballers in Argentina
Expatriate footballers in Mexico
Uruguayan expatriate sportspeople in Colombia
Uruguayan expatriate sportspeople in Argentina
Uruguayan expatriate sportspeople in Mexico